SŽ series 713/715 is a two-car diesel multiple unit series of the Slovenian Railways, built between 1983 and 1986. A set consists of a motor wagon, numbered as 713, and a trailer, numbered as 715. These units operate on non-electrified tracks, mostly on the Ljubljana–Novo Mesto–Metlika, Sevnica–Trebnje and Ljubljana–Kamnik lines. Because of the previous colour scheme the units are popularly nicknamed "kanarček" (canary).

History
The units were designed in the MBB Donauwörth company in Germany with cooperation of Yugoslav engineers. The first five sets were built in MBB Donauwörth and finished in the TVT Boris Kidrič Maribor factory, and the rest of them (22 sets) were built in Maribor out of parts sent from Germany.

The series was built in two versions, as a first-class business train (5 sets of subseries 713-0xx, in green colour scheme, with 92 revolvable seats, a kitchen and loudspeakers) and as a standard commuter train (22 sets of subseries 713-1xx, in yellow-and-orange colour scheme, with 128 seats). All of the business trains were later converted into standard trains, and the colour scheme of all units is gradually being changed into red.

References and external links
Discussion about SŽ 713/715 on the Vlaki.info forum (in Slovene)
SŽ 713 Kanarček - Tinetova stran o železnici (archived) (in Slovene)
Slovenian Railways Rolling Stock by Bojan Dremelj - issuu

Specific

Diesel multiple units of Slovenia